90 Tauri (90 Tau) is a star in the zodiac constellation of Taurus, located 144 light-years away from the Sun. It is visible to the naked eye as a faint, white-hued star with an apparent visual magnitude of 4.27. 90 Tauri is a member of the Hyades cluster and is listed as a double star.

This is an A-type main-sequence star with a stellar classification of A6 V. It has 2.1 times the mass of the Sun and 2.8 times the Sun's radius. An orbiting companion was announced in 2014. This is probably a spectral class K4V star with an estimated orbital period of at least 84 days. The primary is being orbited by a debris disk.

References

A-type main-sequence stars
Hyades (star cluster)
Taurus (constellation)
Tauri, c
Durchmusterung objects
Tauri, 090
029388
021589
1473